To Rock or Not to Be is the twelfth studio album by the Swiss hard rock band Krokus, released in 1995. The album stayed seven weeks in the top ten of the Swiss charts, peaking at number 5.

The album briefly reunited 4/5th of the One Vice at a Time line-up, with only bassist Chris von Rohr missing who was working as a producer and songwriter for Swiss act Gotthard at the time.

Track listing
"Lion Heart" (Fernando von Arb, Jürg Naegeli, Marc Storace) – 5:16
"Flying Through the Night" (von Arb, Naegeli, Many Maurer, Storace) – 3:56
"To Rock or Not to Be" (von Arb, Storace) – 3:23
"In the Dead of Night" (von Arb, Maurer, Storace) – 5:07
"Natural Blonde" (von Arb, Naegeli, Maurer, Storace) – 5:12
"Doggy Style" (von Arb, Freddy Steady, Naegeli, Maurer, Storace, Mark Kohler) – 4:02
"Talking Like a Shotgun" (von Arb, Steady, Naegeli, Maurer, Storace, Kohler) – 4:08
"Soul to Soul" (von Arb, Naegeli, Maurer, Storace) – 4:55
"Stop the World" (von Arb, Naegeli) – 5:14
"You Ain't Got the Guts to Do It" (von Arb, Naegeli, Maurer, Storace, Kohler) – 3:06
"Wagon Gone" (Naegeli, Maurer, Storace, Kohler) – 5:01
"Stormy Nights" (von Arb, Naegeli, Maurer, Storace, Kohler) – 5:14

Personnel
Krokus
Marc Storace – lead vocals
Fernando von Arb – lead guitar, rhythm guitar, keyboards, bass, producer
Mark Kohler – rhythm guitar, bass
Many Maurer – bass, lead guitar, producer, engineer
Freddy "Steady" Frutig – drums, percussion
Jurg Naegeli – keyboards, bass, mixing, engineering

Additional musicians
Andy Portmann, Chris Egger, Tony Castell – backing vocals

Production
Ian Cooper - mastering

Charts

References

External links
 To Rock or Not to Be page on the Krokus official website

1995 albums
Krokus (band) albums